A chromatid (Greek khrōmat- 'color' + -id) is one half of a duplicated chromosome. Before replication, one chromosome is composed of one DNA molecule. In replication, the DNA molecule is copied, and the two molecules are known as chromatids. During the later stages of cell division these chromatids separate longitudinally to become individual chromosomes.

Chromatid pairs are normally genetically identical, and said to be homozygous. However, if mutations occur, they will present slight differences, in which case they are heterozygous. The pairing of chromatids should not be confused with the ploidy of an organism, which is the number of homologous versions of a chromosome.

Sister chromatids

Chromatids may be sister or non-sister chromatids. A sister chromatid is either one of the two chromatids of the same chromosome joined together by a common centromere. A pair of sister chromatids is called a dyad. Once sister chromatids have separated (during the anaphase of mitosis or the anaphase II of meiosis during sexual reproduction), they are again called chromosomes, each having the same genetic mass as one of the individual chromatids that made up its parent. The DNA sequence of two sister chromatids is completely identical (apart from very rare DNA copying errors).

Sister chromatid exchange (SCE) is the exchange of genetic information between two sister chromatids.  SCEs can occur during mitosis or meiosis.  SCEs appear to primarily reflect DNA recombinational repair processes responding to DNA damage (see articles Sister chromatids and Sister chromatid exchange).

Non-sister chromatids, on the other hand, refers to either of the two chromatids of paired homologous chromosomes, that is, the pairing of a paternal chromosome and a maternal chromosome. In chromosomal crossovers, non-sister (homologous) chromatids form chiasmata to exchange genetic material during the prophase I of meiosis (See Homologous chromosome pair).

See also
Kinetochore

References

Chromosomes
Molecular genetics
Cell biology
Mitosis
Telomeres